Tabaran is a studio album credited to Not Drowning, Waving and the Musicians of Rabaul, Papua New Guinea featuring Telek, released in 1990. At the ARIA Music Awards of 1992, the album was nominated for the ARIA Award for Best Indigenous Release.

Track listing 
 "Tabaran" – 5:02
 "The Kiap Song" – 4:30
 "Pila Pila" – 2:21
 "Sing Sing" – 4:47
 "Rain" – 3:50
 "Feast" – 2:30
 "Boys On the Beach" – 0:54
 "Blackwater" – 5:50
 "Abebe" – 2:28
 "Lapun Man" – 3:20
 "Up in the Mountains" – 5:19
 "Azehe" – 2:20
 "Call Across the Highlands" – 2:21
 "Funeral Chant" – 3:25

Charts

References 

1990 albums